Owen Phillips may refer to:

 Owen Phillips (priest) (1826–1897), Dean of St David's
 Owen Phillips (rugby league), Welsh rugby league footballer who played in the 1950s
 Owen Phillips (sport shooter) (1906–?), Belizean sports shooter
 Owen Hood Phillips (1907–1986), legal writer
 Owen Martin Phillips (1930–2010), American physical oceanographer and geophysicist
 Owen Phillips (general) (1882–1966), officer in the Australian Army